The Namsan Public Library is a library located in Yongsan-gu near Mt. Namsan of Seoul, South Korea. Since its establishment on October 22, 1922, during the Japanese occupation, the library has owned a variety of resources encompassing from ancient historic books, Japanese books to contemporary digital technology books.

The main users of the Namsan public library are adults. Also, Namsan public library offers a special room for children of multicultural families.

References

External links
 Official site (Korean/English/Japanese)

Buildings and structures in Yongsan District
Libraries in Seoul
Libraries established in 1922